Saling may refer to:

 Saling, Missouri - an unincorporated community in Audrain County, in the U.S. state of Missouri
 Saling, Pakistan - a village of Ghanche District, Pakistan
 Saling Gewog - a gewog (village block) of Mongar District, Bhutan
 Bardfield Saling - a village and in the Braintree district of the English county of Essex
 Great Saling - a village and in the Braintree district of the English county of Essex
 Jay Saling -  the former bassist of Michigan heavy metal band Battlecross

See also 
 Sailing (disambiguation)